Charity Still (c. 1775 – 1857) gave birth to 18 children and 4 of those children are assumed to die at child birth.  She was a matriarch of the American abolition movement.  Her son William Still became a well known abolitionist in Philadelphia, Pennsylvania.

Early life
Sidney (later renamed Charity) was born in slavery in the eighteenth century, on a plantation in the Caroline County, Maryland. When she was a child, her father was killed by the plantation's master.

Sidney met Levin Still (or Steel) while they were both enslaved in Maryland. They had four children together before Levin was able to buy his own freedom and move to Shamong Township, Ne Jersey. She escaped with her four children, all very young, and reunited with Levin Still in New Jersey. A few months later, Charity and all the children were captured and returned to Maryland. On her next escape, she left her two sons, Levin Jr. and Peter, in the care of their grandmother, and reached New Jersey again with her two daughters, Mahalia and Kitturah. The older sons remained in slavery; one died from cruel treatment, the other, Peter, eventually gained his freedom and reunited with Charity Still in 1850.  He purchased his freedom and was reunited with mother in 1850.  He lived out the rest of life in Burlington Township, New Jersey.

Life in the North
To prevent another recapture, Levin and Charity Still moved into a secluded area of the Pine Barrens, a placed named Shamong Township, New Jersey, where their other children were born. Their youngest son was William Still (c1821-1902), a Philadelphia businessman who worked with the Pennsylvania Society for the Abolition of Slavery. The  New York Times pronounced in William's  obituary to be "The Father of the Underground Railroad". The term "Underground Railroad" for the network of people, vehicles, and buildings used to aid people escaping slavery. He personally assisted hundreds of people seeking freedom. Another son, James Still, was denied formal medical training, worked as a herbalist healer in the African-American community.  James home and medical office was located in Medford, New Jersey.   Charity Still died in 1857, aged about 82 years. One of Charity Still's granddaughters was William's daughter, Caroline Still Anderson (1848-1919), who became a medical doctor.

References

External links
 Francine C. Still Hicks, A Girl Named Charity (Balboa Press 2015). . A picture book for young readers, based on the life of Charity Still.
 Lurey Khan, William Still and the Underground Railroad: Fugitive Slaves and Family Ties (iUniverse 2010). 

1770s births
1857 deaths
18th-century American slaves
Underground Railroad people
Virginia colonial people
 18th-century African-American women
 19th-century African-American women